Ringwood is a town in Major County, Oklahoma, United States. The population was 497 at the 2010 census, a 17.2 percent increase from the 2000 census. The population is now estimated to be 510.
The town was given its name because it was ringed by woods from northwest to southeast, though the town is no longer accurate to its name.

Geography
Ringwood is located at  (36.380017, -98.243927).

Demographics

As of the census of 2000, there were 424 people, 160 households, and 120 families residing in the city. There were 172 housing units at an average density of 197.6 per square mile (76.3/km2). The racial makeup of the city was 70.99% White, 0.24% African American, 27.12% from other races, and 1.65% from two or more races.

There were 160 households, out of which 35.6% had children under the age of 18 living with them, 62.5% were married couples living together, 4.4% had a female householder with no husband present, and 25.0% were non-families. 23.1% of all households were made up of individuals, and 15.6% had someone living alone who was 65 years of age or older. The average household size was 2.65 and the average family size was 3.13.

In the city the population was spread out, with 29.7% under the age of 18, 8.5% from 18 to 24, 25.9% from 25 to 44, 18.6% from 45 to 64, and 17.2% who were 65 years of age or older. The median age was 35 years. For every 100 females, there were 104.8 males. For every 100 females age 18 and over, there were 98.7 males.

The median income for a household in the city was $30,000, and the median income for a family was $40,250. Males had a median income of $26,250 versus $18,750 for females. The per capita income for the city was $15,809. About 19.2% of families and 22.1% of the population were below the poverty line, including 30.4% of those under age 18 and 16.4% of those age 65 or over.

References

Towns in Major County, Oklahoma
Towns in Oklahoma